Ernst Ulrich Hans von Leyser (18 November 1889 – 23 September 1962) was a general in the Wehrmacht of Nazi Germany during World War II who commanded several army corps. 

After the war, in 1947, Leyser was tried for war crimes committed in the Balkans and sentenced to ten years of imprisonment during the Hostages Trial; his sentence was commuted to time served and he was released in 1951.

Life

World War II
During the invasion of France, Leyser commanded a regiment. In April 1941 he was appointed commander of the 269th Infantry Division. As part of the Army Group North, the division fought in northern Soviet Union after the launching of Operation Barbarossa. On 18 September 1941 he was awarded the Knight's Cross of the Iron Cross and command of the XXVI Army Corps during the siege of Leningrad.

On 1 December 1942 Leyser assumed command of the XXVI Army Corps. Almost a year later, he was assigned to lead the XV Mountain Army Corps, which was fighting against Yugoslav partisans in Croatia. On 20 July 1944 (coincidentally, the day of the failed assassination of Adolf Hitler) he switched command with General Gustav Fehn, commander of the XXI Mountain Army Corps (Germany) in the Balkans. 

On 29 April 1945, he was relieved of command.  Leyser was arrested by the United States forces on 8 May.

Trial and conviction

Leyser was tried, as subordinate to General Lothar Rendulic, along with 12 other high-ranking German officers in the Hostages Trial, from 13 May 1947 to 19 February 1948. He was found guilty on two charges of crimes against humanity and war crimes: murder and mistreatment of POWs and murder and mistreatment of civilians. Leyser was sentenced to 10 years of imprisonment in December 1947. On 31 January 1951, John J. McCloy, the US High Commissioner in Germany, revised his sentence to time served.

Death
Leyser died in Garstedt on 23 September 1962, at the age of 73.

Awards
 Iron Cross (1914) 2nd and 1st Class 
 House Order of Hohenzollern, Knight's Cross with swords
 Baltic Cross
 The Honour Cross of the World War 1914/1918 with swords
 Clasp to the Iron Cross (1939) 2nd and 1st Class 
Johanittenorden (Ehrenritter)
Knight's Cross of the Iron Cross on 18 September 1941 as Generalmajor and commander of the 269. Infanterie-Division
German Cross in Gold on 14 April 1943 as General der Infanterie and commanding general of the XXVI. Armeekorps

References

Sources

 

1889 births
1962 deaths
Military personnel from Berlin
People from the Province of Brandenburg
Recipients of the Knight's Cross of the Iron Cross
Recipients of the Gold German Cross
German people convicted of war crimes
German people convicted of crimes against humanity
People convicted by the United States Nuremberg Military Tribunals
German Army generals of World War II
Generals of Infantry (Wehrmacht)
Reichswehr personnel
People from Steglitz-Zehlendorf